Gábor Világosi (born January 12, 1956) is a Hungarian politician and jurist, who served as one of the Deputy Speakers of the National Assembly of Hungary from September 16, 2004 to May 13, 2010. He was a member of the National Assembly of Hungary between 1990 and 2010. He was a founding member of the Alliance of Free Democrats. He left the party in 2010.

Personal life
He is since 1982. His wife is Klára Szentiványi. They have four children - two daughters, Gabriella, Dóra and two sons, Márton, Mihály

References

Parlament.hu 
Választás.hu 

1956 births
Living people
Alliance of Free Democrats politicians
Members of the National Assembly of Hungary (1990–1994)
Members of the National Assembly of Hungary (1994–1998)
Members of the National Assembly of Hungary (1998–2002)
Members of the National Assembly of Hungary (2002–2006)
Members of the National Assembly of Hungary (2006–2010)